Midwest United FC is an American soccer club based in Grand Rapids, Michigan who play in the Great Lakes Division of the USL W League. The team was founded in 2016 as the women's side to the Grand Rapids FC brand. Their first season was in 2017. In December 2019, Midwest United FC assumed ownership of the team and rebranded it under their name.

History
Grand Rapids FC (GRFC) was started in 2014 by a group of Grand Rapids residents as a community-funded project. The men's team's first season was in 2015 in the newly formed Great Lakes Premier League before moving to the National Premier Soccer League. After two successful seasons that showed average attendance figures over 4,000 each season, the owners announced on November 1, 2016 that they would be adding a women's team to the Grand Rapids FC brand. Their first season was in 2017 in the United Women's Soccer league.

The Grand Rapids FC women won the 2017 UWS Championship in their inaugural season  on July 22, 2017 at their home stadium, defeating the defending champions Santa Clarita Blue Heat 3 goals to 1.

In December 2019, the Grand Rapids FC brand underwent restructuring. The ownership model was changed and the men's team changed leagues. During this time, the ownership of the women's side was transferred to Midwest United FC and their name was changed to reflect this change.

Stadium
The team's current stadium is Midwest United FC Soccer Complex in Grand Rapids, Michigan. The team's original home field was at Grandville High School in Grandville, Michigan. They have also played home matches at Aquinas College and Houseman Field.

Record attendance
 2,814 - July 2, 2017 vs Toledo Villa FC at Houseman Field (second game of a doubleheader following GRFC men, attendance counted both games)
 1,034 - July 22, 2017 vs Santa Clarita Blue Heat (single game record)

Players

2022 roster

Notable former players
 Bethany Balcer (2017) now with OL Reign and called up to the United States national team
 Maddie Pogarch (2017) now with San Diego Wave FC and called up to the United States national U-23 team
 Maia Perez (2018–2021) now with Angel City FC
 Riley Tanner (2019–2022) now with Washington Spirit and called up to the Panama national team

Head coaches
  Lewis Robinson (2017, 2020–present)
  Chris Allen (2018)
  James Gilpin (2018–2019)

Honors
United Women's Soccer
National championships (1): 2017
Conference season championships (2)
Midwest Conference: 2017
Midwest North Conference: 2021
Conference playoff championships (3)
Midwest Conference: 2017, 2018, 2021
Minor competitions
UWS Stadium Showcase: 2020

Year-by-year

Historic record vs opponents

 Note: Table includes all competitive matches and does not include friendlies.
Updated to end of 2022 season.

Player records

Goals

Appearances 

 Note: Table includes all competitive matches and does not include friendlies.
Updated to end of 2022 season
Reference:

References

External links
 Official team site

Association football clubs established in 2016
Soccer clubs in Michigan
Sports in Grand Rapids, Michigan
2016 establishments in Michigan
United Women's Soccer teams
USL W League teams